Suffocating the Bloom is second full-length studio album by the progressive rock band Echolyn.  The album was released on November 28, 1992, at a release party at the 23 East Cabaret in Ardmore, Pennsylvania.

Recording for Suffocating the Bloom began at the William Bolten Dixon American Legion Post #10 on July 15, 1992. After two days, the recording process moved to the band's own Farmhouse Studio. Recording was completed on August 27 at Forge Recording Studio. Mixing was completed at Forge in October 1992.

From the Gardener's Guide, a printed companion to the album:

According to vocalist Ray Weston, the 28-minute epic, Suite for the Everyman, was "an explosion of emotion built up by the release of our first CD. Only to have it rejected by all the labels solicited. It's a basic single finger salute to those who said it could not be done. About sticking with integrity of your ideals." According to guitarist/vocalist Brett Kull, their initial intent was to write a second part to "Shades" from their debut album, but it morphed into the multi-part epic that closed out Suffocating the Bloom.

The first 1,000 copies of Suffocating the Bloom had silver discs with black print, including a few spelling mistakes ("Winterthru" is printed as two words and "Memoirs from Between" is labeled as "Memories from Between"). The second run of 1,000, produced approximately four months later, included red discs with yellow print and all mistakes corrected. A third run of 500 was printed in the spring of 1995 and contained all-black discs.

In 2000, echolyn received their master recordings back from Sony Music. They were hand-delivered to the band by record exec Michael Caplan at the Theater of Living Arts in Philadelphia in late June 2000 where the band was opening for prog-rock supergroup Transatlantic. This provided the band the opportunity to remaster and reissued the album as it had been out of print for close to eight years. The band pressed approximately 6,000 copies of the remaster in late 2000 with updated artwork and packaging.

Track listing 

A Suite for the Everyman (28:13)

Personnel
Band Members
 Ray Weston – lead vocals
 Brett Kull – guitars, lead and backing vocals
 Christopher Buzby – keyboards, vocals
 Paul Ramsey – drums, percussion
 Tom Hyatt – bass, MIDI pedals

Guest musicians
 Katharine Shenk - violin
 Richard Casimir - violin
 Jeffrey E. Meyers - violin
 Elizabeth C. Detweiler - viola
 Kimberly Shenk - cello
 Laura Anthony - flute
 Heather Groll - flute
 Dainis Roman - alto saxophone
 Jim Dwyer - marching snares
 Tom Kelly - marching snares

References

External links
 
 

1992 albums
Echolyn albums